In probability theory and statistics, given a stochastic process, the autocovariance is a function that gives the covariance of the process with itself at pairs of time points. Autocovariance is closely related to the autocorrelation of the process in question.

Auto-covariance of stochastic processes

Definition 
With the usual notation  for the expectation operator, if the stochastic process  has the mean function , then the autocovariance is given by

Definition for weakly stationary process 
If  is a weakly stationary (WSS) process, then the following are true:

 for all 

and

 for all 

and

where  is the lag time, or the amount of time by which the signal has been shifted.

The autocovariance function of a WSS process is therefore given by:

which is equivalent to

.

Normalization 
It is common practice in some disciplines (e.g. statistics and time series analysis) to normalize the autocovariance function to get a time-dependent Pearson correlation coefficient. However in other disciplines (e.g. engineering) the normalization is usually dropped and the terms "autocorrelation" and "autocovariance" are used interchangeably.

The definition of the normalized auto-correlation of a stochastic process is

.

If the function  is well-defined, its value must lie in the range , with 1 indicating perfect correlation and −1 indicating perfect anti-correlation.

For a WSS process, the definition is

.

where

.

Properties

Symmetry property

respectively for a WSS process:

Linear filtering
The autocovariance of a linearly filtered process 

is

Calculating turbulent diffusivity
Autocovariance can be used to calculate turbulent diffusivity. Turbulence in a flow can cause the fluctuation of velocity in space and time. Thus, we are able to identify turbulence through the statistics of those fluctuations.

To determine , a set of velocity measurements that are assembled from points in space, moments in time or repeated experiments is required.

If we assume the turbulent flux  (and c is the concentration term) can be caused by a random walk, we can use Fick's laws of diffusion to express the turbulent flux term:

The velocity autocovariance is defined as

 or 

The turbulent diffusivity  can be calculated using the following 3 methods:

Auto-covariance of random vectors

See also 
 Autoregressive process
 Correlation
 Cross-covariance
 Cross-correlation
 Noise covariance estimation (as an application example)

References

Further reading 
 
 Lecture notes on autocovariance from WHOI

Fourier analysis
Autocorrelation